International University for Graduate Studies is a private university in Portsmouth, Dominica.

In 2004, the Chronicle of Higher Education published an op-ed questioning the legitimacy of the institution. In 2015 IUGS became accredited by the National Accreditation Board of Dominica.

References

External links
IUGS official site

Educational institutions established in 1979
Universities and colleges in Dominica